Matthew Bozinovski (born 5 January 2001) is a professional footballer who plays as a defender for  Melbourne Victory. Born in Australia, he is a youth international for North Macedonia.

References

External links

2001 births
Living people
Soccer players from Melbourne
Macedonian footballers
North Macedonia under-21 international footballers
Australian soccer players
Australian people of Macedonian descent
Association football defenders
Wellington Phoenix FC players
Melbourne Victory FC players
National Premier Leagues players
A-League Men players
People from Carlton, Victoria